The National Agricultural Fieldays is an annual national agricultural show and field day event held in mid-June at the Mystery Creek Events Centre near Hamilton, New Zealand.  It styles itself as "the biggest agricultural trade show in the southern hemisphere".

Fieldays attracts 1,000 exhibitors and over 115,000 visitors through its gates. Smaller shows, held annually in New Zealand's towns and communities, are generally called agricultural and pastoral shows (A&P shows). The event has visitor attractions such as sheepdog trials and tractor pulling contests.

Between 1985 and 1998 the Fieldays Society operated a short-term radio station for Fieldays visitors. Ag Week Radio, later known as Fieldays Radio, operated from the Mystery Creek site. It broadcast on 1XR 855 AM in 1985 and 1988, 1296 AM in 1993, 792 AM in 1994, 94.6 FM in 1997 and 97.0 FM in 1998.

See also
Agriculture in New Zealand
Field days in Australia
Field day (agriculture)

References

External links
National Agricultural Fieldays

Trade fairs in New Zealand
Agricultural shows in New Zealand
Defunct radio stations in New Zealand
Summer events in New Zealand
Events in Hamilton, New Zealand